Regional Best 2011 is a volume in the Regional Best anthology series, edited by William Roetzheim, that honors the best plays to premiere at major regional and LORT theaters in the United States each year.

Plays included

Notes

American plays
American anthologies
2011 in the United States